Richard James Hollis Roberts (30 March 1878 – 5 March 1931) was an English footballer who played as a winger.

Career 
Roberts was born in Redditch in Worcestershire. He turned professional with West Bromwich Albion in April 1899, but remained with the club for just two years. In May 1901 he joined Newcastle United for a £150 fee, before signing for Middlesbrough for £450 in April 1904. Roberts moved to Crystal Palace for £100 in August 1905, and three years later joined Worcester City, before retiring in April 1909 due to injury. He died in Birmingham in 1931, aged 52.

References 
 
 

1878 births
1931 deaths
Sportspeople from Redditch
English footballers
Association football wingers
West Bromwich Albion F.C. players
Newcastle United F.C. players
Middlesbrough F.C. players
Crystal Palace F.C. players
Worcester City F.C. players